Craig Channell (born April 24, 1962) is a Canadian former professional ice hockey player.

Following the 1989-90 season,  Channell hung-up his skates to become the head amateur scout for the Washington Capitals of the National Hockey League. He is currently an amateur scout with the Minnesota Wild.

Career statistics

References

External links

1962 births
Living people
Fort Wayne Komets players
Indianapolis Ice players
Minnesota Wild scouts
Nashville Predators scouts
St. Louis Blues scouts
Seattle Breakers players
Sherbrooke Canadiens players
Sherbrooke Jets players
Ice hockey people from Vancouver
Washington Capitals scouts
Canadian ice hockey defencemen